The University of Arizona Press, a publishing house founded in 1959 as a department of the University of Arizona, is a nonprofit publisher of scholarly and regional books. As a delegate of the University of Arizona to the larger world, the Press publishes the work of scholars wherever they may be, concentrating upon scholarship that reflects the special strengths of the University of Arizona, Arizona State University, and Northern Arizona University.

The Press publishes about fifty books annually and has some 1,400 books in print. These include scholarly titles in American Indian studies, anthropology, archaeology, environmental studies, geography, Chicano studies, history, Latin American studies, and the space sciences. The UA Press has award-winning books in more than 30 subject areas.

The UA Press also publishes general interest books on Arizona and the Southwest borderlands. In addition, the Press publishes books of personal essays, such as Nancy Mairs's Plaintext and two series in literature: Sun Tracks: An American Indian Literary Series and Camino del Sol: A Chicana/o Literary Series.

Camino del Sol 
The University of Arizona began their Camino del Sol Series in 1994, focusing on Chicanx and Latinx Literature. In 2010, Rigoberto Gonzalez edited an anthology honoring the series, also published by the University of Arizona press. Camino del Sol authors include: Farid Matuk, Pat Mora, Daniel A. Olivas, Sergio Troncoso, Luis Alberto Urrea, Vickie Vértiz, Tim Z. Hernandez, Juan Felipe Herrera, Emmy Pérez, Ray Gonzalez, Carmen Giménez Smith, Roberto Tejada, and more.

See also

 List of English-language book publishing companies
 List of university presses

References

External links
 University of Arizona Press website

Arizona
Press
Publishing companies established in 1959